The Yugoslavia men's university basketball team was the men's basketball team, administered by Basketball Federation of Yugoslavia, that represents Socialist Federal Republic of Yugoslavia in the Summer Universiade men's basketball tournament.

After the dissolution of SFR Yugoslavia in 1991, the successor countries all set up their own national university basketball teams.

Competitive record

Rosters

New national teams 
After the dissolution of SFR Yugoslavia in 1991, five new countries were created: Bosnia and Herzegovina, Croatia, FYR Macedonia, FR Yugoslavia (in 2003, renamed to Serbia and Montenegro) and Slovenia. In 2006, Montenegro became an independent nation and Serbia became the legal successor of Serbia and Montenegro. In 2008, Kosovo declared independence from Serbia and became a FIBA member in 2015.

Here is a list of men's university teams on the SFR Yugoslavia area:
  (1992–present)
  (1992–present)
  (1993–present)
  Serbia and Montenegro (1992–2006)
  (2006–present)
  Serbia (2006–present)
  (2015–present)
  (1992–present)

See also 
 Yugoslavia men's national basketball team
 Yugoslavia men's national under-19 basketball team
 Yugoslavia men's national under-18 basketball team
 Yugoslavia men's national under-16 basketball team

References

University